José Bayardi (born 30 June 1955 in Montevideo) is a Uruguayan physician and politician belonging to the Broad Front.

He has served both as Defence and Labor minister during the presidencies of Tabaré Vázquez and José Mujica.

In 2020 he takes part in the talk show Todas las voces.

References

External links

Living people
1955 births
University of the Republic (Uruguay) alumni
20th-century Uruguayan physicians
Broad Front (Uruguay) politicians
Ministers of Labor and Social Affairs of Uruguay
Defence ministers of Uruguay